Vesuvio Cafe is an historic bar in San Francisco, California, United States. Located at 255 Columbus Avenue, across an alley from City Lights Bookstore, the building was designed by Italian architect Italo Zanolini and finished in 1916.

History
The bar was founded in 1948 by Henri Lenoir, and was frequented by a number of Beat Generation celebrities including Jack Kerouac, Allen Ginsberg, Lawrence Ferlinghetti, and Neal Cassady.

Former part-owner and manager emeritus Leo Riegler died in 2017.

The common alley shared with City Lights was originally called "Adler" but was renamed "Jack Kerouac Alley" in 1988. The alley was refurbished and converted to pedestrian only in 2007.

References

External links

1948 establishments in California
Bars (establishments)
Chinatown, San Francisco
Drinking establishments in the San Francisco Bay Area
Restaurants established in 1948
Restaurants in San Francisco